Exidia thuretiana (common name white brain ) is a jelly fungus in the family Auriculariaceae. The fruit bodies are white and gelatinous with brain-like folds. It is a common, wood-rotting species in Europe, typically growing on dead attached or fallen branches of broadleaf trees, especially beech.

Taxonomy
The species was originally found growing on beech in France and was described in 1848 by Joseph-Henri Léveillé as Tremella thuretiana. It was subsequently transferred to the genus Exidia by Fries in 1874.

Donk preferred the name Exidia albida (Huds.) Bref. for this species, but most later authors have followed Reid in considering E. albida a nomen dubium (name of uncertain application) that might originally have referred to any whitish or transparent jelly fungus.

The epithet "thuretiana" compliments botanist Gustave Thuret, owner of the Château de Rentilly, in the grounds of which E. thuretiana was first collected. The recommended English name is "white brain".

Description

Exidia thuretiana forms shallowly pulvinate (cushion-shaped), gelatinous fruit bodies that individually measure  in diameter. The fruit bodies quickly coalesce, often running along the underside of branches and extending up to 10 cm (4 in) or more. They typically appear undulating or pleated and are whitish, occasionally with ochre or pinkish tints. The upper, spore-bearing surface (hymenium) is smooth and opaque, but is frequently furrowed and folded. It can have a pruinose (powder-like) coating. With age, the hymenium becomes a thin, horny, yellowish film. The spore print is white. The fungus does not have any distinct taste or odor; it is inedible.

Microscopic characters
The microscopic characters are typical of the genus Exidia. The basidia are ellipsoid, longitudinally septate, and measure 14–20 x 8.5–12 µm. The spores are allantoid (sausage-shaped), with dimensions of 13–18 x 5.5–7 µm. hyphae have a diameter ranging from 1 to 2.5 µm.

Similar species
Fruit bodies of Myxarium nucleatum are similarly coloured, but are typically pustular or lobed (never appearing pleated) and usually contain conspicuous, white, granular inclusions. Microscopically Myxarium nucleatum can be distinguished by its stalked basidia.

Habitat and distribution
Exidia thuretiana is a wood-rotting species, typically found on dead attached or fallen branches. It was originally recorded on beech and frequently occurs on this substrate, but is also known from other broadleaf trees and shrubs, including oak, hazel, ash, and apple. Exidia thuretiana typically fruits in autumn and winter. It is widely distributed in Europe, North Africa, and northern Asia. It has been collected from Greenland.

References

Auriculariales
Fungi described in 1848
Fungi of Africa
Fungi of Asia
Fungi of Europe